Butch Cassidy was an American outlaw named Robert LeRoy Parker.

Butch Cassidy may also refer to:

Butch Cassidy (singer), stage name of Danny Elliott Means II
Butch Cassidy's Wild Bunch, an American outlaw gang
Butch Cassidy (TV series), an American children's animated television series
Butch Cassidy and the Sundance Kid, a 1969 American Western film
Bruce Cassidy, a Canadian hockey coach and former player who has been nicknamed "Butch"

See also
Butch and Cassidy, characters in the Pokémon anime television series